1: Man 2: Band is a live double album by the Norwegian singer, multi-instrumentalist, composer and performer Jarle Bernhoft, recorded in 2009 and released in 2010.

Track listing
Source: Gubemusic

Personnel

1: Man
 Jarle Bernhoft - vocals, guitar, synthesizer, beats

2: Band
Jarle Bernhoft - Vocals, Guitars,  Effects,  Flute,  Keyboard
Hedvig Mollestad Thomassen,  Guitar,  Vocals
Line Horntveth - Percussion,  Flute,  vocals
David Wallumrød - Wurlitzer,  Hammond Organ,  Clavinette
Audun Erlien - Bass
Martin Windstad - Percussion
Torstein Lofthus - Drums

References

2010 live albums
Jarle Bernhoft live albums